Maristas Colegio Sagrado Corazón Valencia (also Marist College Valencia and Sacred Heart College Valencia) was founded by the Marist Brothers in 1897 in Valencia, Spain. Students range from pre-primary through secondary.

References  

Marist Brothers schools
Catholic schools in Spain
Educational institutions established in 1897
1897 establishments in Spain